Tuy Hòa Base Camp (also known as Phú Hiệp Airfield or Phú Hiệp Army Airfield) is a former U.S. Army base southeast of Tuy Hòa in Phú Yên Province Vietnam.

History

The base was located approximately 5 km east of Highway 1 and 7 km southeast of Tuy Hoa Air Base.

The base was used by the 1st Brigade, 4th Infantry Division comprising:
1st Battalion, 8th Infantry
3rd Battalion, 8th Infantry
1st Battalion, 12th Infantry
from October 1966 to June 1967.

The 173rd Airborne Brigade was based at Tuy Hòa from October–November 1967.

Other units stationed at Tuy Hòa/Phú Hiệp included:
3rd Battalion, 22nd Infantry (December 1970-January 1972)
91st Evacuation Hospital (December 1966-July 1969)
203rd Reconnaissance Airplane Company (October 1967-July 1970)
225th Aviation Company
268th Aviation Battalion
577th Engineer Battalion

Once the U.S. Air Force ceased operations at Tuy Hòa Air Base in October 1970 the U.S. Army units based at Tuy Hòa/Phú Hiệp moved to Tuy Hòa Air Base and the facility was closed.

Accidents and incidents
2 December 1967 Bell UH-1D Iroquois #66-00811 of the 48th Assault Helicopter Company disappeared after taking off from Phú Hiệp with 4 crew and passengers on board in bad weather, the remains of the crew were recovered in 1993
10 July 1971 UH-1C #66-00636 of the 134th Assault Helicopter Company crashed at Phú Hiệp while on a mechanical check flight from Tuy Hòa Air Base killing all 3 crew and passengers.
2 April 1971 Boeing CH-47 Chinook #67-18545 of the 180th Aviation Company (Assault Support Helicopter), was destroyed by an explosion and fire when it experienced a blade strike with a revetment while taxiing and was totally destroyed.

Current use
The base is abandoned and turned over to farmland and housing.

References

Installations of the United States Army in South Vietnam
Military installations closed in 1970
Buildings and structures in Phú Yên province